Lara Sharma (born 1 October 1999) is an Indian footballer who plays as a goalkeeper for Indian Super League side Bengaluru FC.

Career statistics

Honours

Bengaluru
 Durand Cup: 2022

References

Living people
1999 births
Indian footballers
Association football goalkeepers
Bengaluru FC players